The Lac de Tolla is a reservoir in the Corse-du-Sud department of France on the island of Corsica.
It is the largest lake on Corsica, and powers a hydroelectric plant.

Location

The Lac de Tolla is formed by a dam (Barrage de Tolla) on the Prunelli river.
The Ruisseau d'Agnone and the Ese River also empty into the lake.
It is in the commune of Tolla just south of the village of Tolla.
The D3 road runs along its north shore.
There is a belvedere on the heights above the lake from which the dam can be seen. 
It is less than an hour's drive away from Ajaccio.

Dam

The Barrage de Tolla was built between 1958 and 1960, and was commissioned in 1965.
It is owned and operated by Électricité de France (EDF).
It impounds  of water.

Between 3 November and 20 December  of water entered the reservoir, three times its capacity.
Typically the reservoir would receive five times its capacity of water each year.
On 20 December 2019 the Fabien storm caused the dam to overflow, but the structure was not damaged.
When producing the maximum amount of electricity the dam releases  of water per second.

Reservoir

The lake is popular with tourists in the summer from June to September.
Swimming, kayaking, paddling, etc. are allowed, but motorized boats are not allowed. 
Anglers may fish for pike, pike perch, perch, carp, roach and catfish.

See also

List of waterbodies of Corse-du-Sud

Notes

Sources

 

Reservoirs of Corsica